Lourival Mendes França (died 18 August 2012) was Brazilian draughts player (Brazilian draughts and International draughts), world champion in draughts-64 (1993). International grandmaster (GMI) in draughts-64, International master (MI) in International draughts.

Sport achievements 

World champion (Brazilian draughts) 1993.
Brazilian national champion (Brazilian draughts) (1969, 1970, 1991).
Played in Panamerican championship (International draughts), best result fourth place in 1994.
Played in 1982 World draughts championship (International draughts) - 14 place.

References 

Players of international draughts
Brazilian draughts players
2012 deaths